Tianjin First Central Hospital is a hospital in the Chinese metropolis of Tianjin. In addition to other medical services and teaching, it is a major center for liver transplants and otorhinolaryngological diagnosis. It was founded in 1949.

References

External links 
 

Hospitals in Tianjin
Hospitals established in 1949